The 1996–97 BCAFL was the 12th full season of the British Collegiate American Football League, organised by the British Students American Football Association.

Changes from last season
Division Changes
There were no changes to the Divisional setup

Team Changes
University of Derby joined the Northern Conference, as the Braves
University of Kent joined the Southern Conference, as the Falcons
University of Nottingham joined the Northern Conference, as the Outlaws
Reading Knights moved within the Southern Conference from Eastern to Western Division
Sheffield Zulus moved within the Northern Conference from Central to Eastern Division
Stirling Clansmen returned after one season out
This increased the number of teams in BCAFL to 31, an all-time high.

Regular season

Northern Conference, Scottish Division

Northern Conference, Eastern Division

Northern Conference, Central Division

Southern Conference, Eastern Division

Southern Conference, Central Division

Southern Conference, Western Division

Playoffs

Note – the table does not indicate who played home or away in each fixture.

References

External links
 Official BUAFL Website
 Official BAFA Website

1996
1997 in British sport
1996 in British sport
1997 in American football
1996 in American football